ESSA-3 (or TOS-A) was a spin-stabilized operational meteorological satellite. Its name was derived from that of its oversight agency, the Environmental Science Services Administration (ESSA).

Launch 
ESSA-3 was launched on October 2, 1966, at 10:34 UTC. It was launched atop a Delta rocket from Vandenberg Air Force Base, California. ESSA-3 had an inclination of 100.9°, and an orbited the earth once every 114 minutes.

References

Spacecraft launched in 1966
Weather satellites of the United States